Yace (Yache) is an Idomoid language of Cross River State, Nigeria. It is spoken in Yala LGA, Alifokpa, Imbuo, Maa, Osina, Uchu, and Wonya. Yace is closely related to the Akpa language.

References

Idomoid languages